Pure Chewing Satisfaction is the second studio album by American band Lard, released in 1997.

Critical reception

The Fort Worth Star-Telegram wrote that "the sound may be a repetitive industrial/metal grind (think Ministry's 'Just One Fix' times eight) but Biafra's rants are full of vitriol and sharp imagery."

Track listing 
All songs written by Biafra/Jourgensen/Barker/Rieflin except as noted.
"War Pimp Renaissance" – 4:19
"I Wanna Be a Drug-Sniffing Dog"  – 3:17 
"Moths" – 4:57 
"Generation Execute" – 5:42 
"Faith Hope and Treachery" – 3:56 
"Peeling Back the Foreskin of Liberty" – 5:11 
"Mangoat"  – 5:05 
"Sidewinder" – 4:59

Personnel

Lard
Rev. Al Jourgensen – guitars, keyboards, programming, production
Rev. Paul Gordon Barker – bass, keys, programming, production
Ayatollah Jello Biafra – "Mr. Microphone", photography, production
William Rieflin – drums (1, 3–6, 8)

Additional personnel
Jeff Ward – drums (2)
Rey Washam – drums (7)
Mike Scaccia – guitar (2–7)

Charts

References

Lard (band) albums
1997 albums
Alternative Tentacles albums
Albums produced by Al Jourgensen